Forssberg is a surname, likely of Swedish origin. Notable people with the surname include:

Fredrika Limnell (1816-1897), born Catharina Forssberg, Swedish philanthropist, mecenate, feminist, and salonist
Lolotte Forssberg (1766-1840), Swedish noble and lady-in-waiting
Ted Forssberg (1895-1953), Australian cricketer

See also
Forsberg